Lymire methyalea is a moth of the subfamily Arctiinae. It was described by Paul Dognin in 1916. It is found in Peru.

References

Euchromiina
Moths described in 1916